WKCI is a news/talk formatted broadcast radio station licensed to Waynesboro, Virginia, serving Staunton and Eastern Augusta County, Virginia.  WKCI is owned and operated by iHeartMedia, Inc.

References

External links
 NewsRadio WKCY Online

1965 establishments in Virginia
News and talk radio stations in the United States
Radio stations established in 1965
KCI
IHeartMedia radio stations